Kalkallo is a suburb in Melbourne, Victoria, Australia,  north of Melbourne's Central Business District, located within the City of Hume local government area. Kalkallo recorded a population of 5,548 at the 2021 census.

Located on the Hume Freeway, Kalkallo had, until the 2010s, a few streets, a service station and a pub. It was formerly surrounded by farms that were not developed by the urban sprawl of Melbourne.

History

The Kalkallo area is located on the traditional lands of the people of the Woiwurrung. It is believed that the clan which occupied land including, the South Morang area, was the Wurundjeri William. Colonisation occurred in Victoria from 1835, and land sales commenced in the Parish of Kalkallo in 1840. An example of an early rural town settlement, Kalkallo contains many natural and cultural heritage sites of significance including churches, hotels, monuments, bridges, waterways and grasslands. In 1848, residents began requesting a post office for the township, and Kinlochewe Post Office opened on 1 November 1850. The post office was located in the Robert Burns Inn on Summerhill Road and Sydney Road. In 1854 it was moved and renamed Donnybrook, then renamed Kalkallo in 1874, before eventually closing in 1971. During the gold rush years the town boomed as travellers made their way up Sydney Road and the township featured seventeen accommodation houses, a police station, jail and court house. In the 1870s, the duplication of the Hume Highway and the opening of the North East railway line decimated the population.

Environment

Kalkallo is located amongst the large Gilgai plain. Located near Donovans Lane, north-west of the town centre, is the Bald Hill volcano that last erupted over 1 million years ago. Merri Creek runs through Kalkallo to the east of the suburb. The Kalkallo Grasslands are remnants of a large area of grassland which houses many threatened species of plants, amphibians and reptiles.

Flora
 Gilgai Brown Grass
 Small Pepper Cress
 Dianella amoena
 Prasophyllum frenchii
 Pussy tails
 Narrow-leaf new holland daisy
 Chaffy bush-pea
 Smooth rice flower
 Plains Yam Daisy

Fauna
 Growling Grass Frog
 Red-chested buttonquail
 Plains froglet
 Common spade foot toad
 Cunningham's spiny-tailed skink
 Bougainvilles skink
 Lowland copperhead
 Australian Smelt
 Water Rat
 Engaeus Quadrimanus
 Eastern three-lined skink
 Tussock skink
 Little whip snake
 Southern lined earless dragon
 Striped legless lizard

Planning

Kalkallo has been a focus of a number of town planning ideas since colonisation, but did remain largely undeveloped until the 2010s. There are a number of housing developments current being planned and built.

Garden City
As part of the publication We Must Go On: A Study of Planned Reconstruction and Housing Frederick Oswald Barnett, along with W.O. Burt and Frank Heath, focused on improvement of housing in Australia and Melbourne after World War II. Barnett and Burt played a significant role in the Housing Investigation and Slum Abolition Board and the garden city movement was a central focus proposed to solve the slum problems in Melbourne. Frank Heath was an architect who produced town plans based on garden city principles, and plans for Kalkallo as a garden city are printed in We Must Go On. The book does not detail the motives for these plans, however they were never implemented, and as a result Kalkallo remained a small township.

Urban Growth Boundary
Melbourne's Urban Growth Boundary was extended to include Kalkallo in 2010. It was designated as part of the Urban Growth Zone in 2012. Urban sprawl is a divisive topic in Melbourne, as it is claimed to ease housing affordability, but can have significant impacts on the environment, as well as social impacts such as isolation due to a lack of transport infrastructure. The Victorian State Government has expanded the Urban Growth Boundary several times since 2002 as a result of the Melbourne 2030 plan (later known as Melbourne@5million). Melbourne 2030 introduced the notion of creating a limit on urban expansion. However, since the implementation of Melbourne 2030, the boundary has been extended, which is contradictory to a key objective. Plan Melbourne, established in May 2014 highlighted the need for the Metropolitan Planning Authority to establish a permanent urban boundary to replace the urban growth boundary, and restrict further expansion.

Today

Kalkallo, until the 2010s, was a small town servicing the highway trade and surrounding agricultural district. 

Current community infrastructure includes:
 Kalkallo Common (a 9.8 ha crown land grassland reserve managed by Hume City Council)
 Kalkallo Cemetery
 Kalkallo CFA
 John Laffan Memorial Reserve (an 8ha reserve containing two ovals)

New housing developments
As a result of the urban growth boundary expansion, there have been a number of new housing developments established:

 Merrifield – Merrifield is an 880 hectare $8 Billion mixed-use development located on the corner of Donnybrook Road and the Hume Highway. Merrifield has been planned as an integrated mixed use development with capacity to provide 20,000 new jobs and homes for up to 30,000 people.
 Cloverton – Located around the Ball Hill area, plans include a large metropolitan activity centre and a future train station north of Donnybrook. Clovertown will eventually house 30,000 residents.
Kallo – A smaller development north of Donnybrook Road that will border Merri Creek, close to the existing Donnybrook railway station. Master plans outline 730 homes with 2000 residents with facilities such as a community centre, primary school, open space, nature reserve and town centre.
The Woods – Mickleham

Transport

Bus
Two bus routes service Kalkallo:
 : Donnybrook station – Mandalay (Beveridge) via Olivine (Donnybrook). Operated by Broadmeadows Bus Service.
 : Donnybrook station – Craigieburn station via Mickleham. Operated by Dysons.

Train
The nearest railway station is Donnybrook station, located on the Seymour and Shepparton lines. The station is serviced by regional V/Line trains.

See also
 City of Whittlesea – Kalkallo was previously within this local government area.

References

Towns in Victoria (Australia)
Hume Highway
City of Hume